Sylvain Lézard (born 4 May 1862, date of death unknown) was a French fencer. He competed in the men's masters épée event at the 1900 Summer Olympics.

References

External links
 

1862 births
Year of death missing
French male épée fencers
Olympic fencers of France
Fencers at the 1900 Summer Olympics
Sportspeople from Bourges
Place of death missing